The Toyota Hilux Dakar is an off-road competition car based on the Hilux. It has won the FIA World Cup for Cross-Country Rallies in 2016, 2017 and 2021 and the Dakar Rally in 2019 and 2022. Toyota Gazoo Racing SA, headquartered in South Africa, has been using the car since 2016. Prior to that, the car was mainly used by private installations Imperial and Overdrive Racing.

Competition history

Dakar victories

FIA World Cup for Cross-Country Rallies

World Rally-Raid Championship

See also 
Toyota Gazoo Racing
Toyota Hilux

References 

Rally cars
Rally raid cars
Dakar Rally winning cars
Hilux Dakar